Gjelosh Gjokaj (25.07.1933 - 25.09.2016) was a renowned artist from Montenegro. An ethnic Albanian, he was born in the village of Milješ (Alb: Milesh) in Tuzi. After receiving his fine arts degree from the Art Academy in Belgrade in 1963 he proceeded to become part of the faculty until 1969 Pristina, Kosovo. He later immigrated to Rome Italy where he lived and worked until 1983. He was able to leave his mark worldwide with over 45 international solo exhibits and well over 70 group shows. In 1983, he made Augsburg, Germany his primary residence until his death in 2016. He is referred as "father of graphic arts of Kosovo".

Further reading
Fenomenologjia artistike : Vështrim esencial mbi veprën e Gjelosh Gjokajt, Suzana Varvarica, Prishtina, Kosovo: Akademia e Shkencave dhe e Arteve e Kosovës, 2014. Series:	Botime të veçanta, CXL; Seksioni i arteve, Libri 19. OCLC 907948332, .

References

1933 births
2016 deaths
20th-century Albanian painters
Artists from Podgorica
Yugoslav painters
University of Arts in Belgrade alumni
Yugoslav emigrants to Germany
Yugoslav expatriates in Italy
Albanian Roman Catholics
Albanians in Montenegro
Artists from Augsburg